Porohanon is a regional Bisayan language spoken in the Camotes Islands in the province of Cebu in the Philippines. Its closest relatives are Hiligaynon, Capiznon and Masbateño; it is barely intelligible with Cebuano though it shares 87% of its vocabulary with it. It also retains many older features that Cebuano has lost, such as the use of the genitive marker ahead of the second member of a compounded form, the distinction between a definite and indefinite subject marker, and the distinction between a definite genitive marker and a locative one.

Phonology
 

They are contrasted by length.

References

Visayan languages
Languages of Cebu